Carabodes higginsi is a species of mite in the family Carabodidae. Found in North America, it was described as a new species in 1988 by botanist Robert Gatlin Reeves. It occurs in the northeastern United States and in the Maritime Provinces of Canada. The mite is named after a friend of the author, Harold G. Higgins of Salt Lake City, Utah. A study conducted in New York that showed that the mite is one of several that takes shelter in the thallus of the common North American lichen Punctelia rudecta.

References

Sarcoptiformes
Animals described in 1988
Arachnids of North America